Portsmouth North is a constituency represented in the House of Commons of the UK Parliament since 2010 by Penny Mordaunt, the current Leader of the House of Commons and Lord President of the Council. She is a Conservative MP.

Boundaries 

1918–1950: The County Borough of Portsmouth wards of Charles Dickens, Mile End, North End, and Portsea.

1974–1983: The County Borough of Portsmouth wards of Cosham, Farlington, Meredith, Nelson, North End, Paulsgrove, Portsea, and St Mary and Guildhall.

1983–1997: The City of Portsmouth wards of Copnor, Cosham, Drayton and Farlington, Hilsea, Nelson, and Paulsgrove, and the Borough of Havant wards of Purbrook and Stakes.

1997–2010: The City of Portsmouth wards of Copnor, Cosham, Drayton and Farlington, Hilsea, Nelson, and Paulsgrove.

2010–present: The City of Portsmouth wards of Baffins, Copnor, Cosham, Drayton and Farlington, Hilsea, Nelson, and Paulsgrove.

As its name suggests, the constituency covers the northern portion of the city of Portsmouth in Hampshire.

History 
The constituency was created in 1918 when the two-seat Portsmouth constituency was split into three divisions: Central, North and South.

It was abolished for the 1950 general election and largely replaced by a new Portsmouth West constituency as the axis of division changed, but was re-established for the February 1974 general election.

Constituency profile
This urban seat is of average affluence and incomes, with relatively low unemployment compared to the national average measured at the end of 2012 at 3.8% (claimant count) as opposed to 2.3% average across the region.

Taken together with Portsmouth West, it has been one of the most long-standing bellwethers (of the national election winner), having that status since 1966.

Members of Parliament

MPs 1918–1950

MPs since 1974

Elections

Elections in the 2010s

Elections in the 2000s

Elections in the 1990s

Elections in the 1980s

Elections in the 1970s

Elections in the 1940s

Elections in the 1930s

Elections in the 1920s

Election in the 1910s

 Yexley (real name, James Woods) was supported by the Lower-Deck Parliamentary Committee, and also the local Liberal association.

See also 
 List of parliamentary constituencies in Hampshire

Notes

References

Sources 

Parliamentary constituencies in Hampshire
Constituencies of the Parliament of the United Kingdom established in 1918
Constituencies of the Parliament of the United Kingdom disestablished in 1950
Constituencies of the Parliament of the United Kingdom established in 1974
Politics of Portsmouth